Ferrybridge railway station was a railway station located in Ferrybridge, West Yorkshire, England on the London and North Eastern Line. The station was opened in 1882 by the North Eastern Railway, three years after the completion of the Swinton & Knottingley Joint line via Moorthorpe on 1 May 1879 and closed in 1965.

Location

Ferrybridge railway station was located just north of Ferrybridge junction. From Ferrybridge railway station, stations such as Pontefract Baghill (which still remains open today) and Ackworth (closed in 1951) would be reached as well as other stations to Sheffield.

History

Prior to the opening of Ferrybridge railway station, there was no direct link between York and Knottingley. A link between Burton Salmon, Ferrybridge and Knottingley needed to be built, which was completed in 1850. Services from Knottingley ended in 1947, but the station still received calls from Sheffield-to-York local trains until its closure in November 1965.

Station masters

Notes

References

Body, G. (1988), PSL Field Guides - Railways of the Eastern Region Volume 2, Patrick Stephens Ltd, Wellingborough,

External links
 Ferrybridge station on navigable 1947 O. S. map

Disused railway stations in Wakefield
Former Swinton and Knottingley Joint Railway stations
Railway stations in Great Britain opened in 1882
Railway stations in Great Britain closed in 1965
Knottingley